Dave Little (7 January 1931 – 17 November 2022) was an Australian rules footballer who played with Collingwood in the Victorian Football League (VFL).

Notes

External links 

Dave Little at Forever.CollingwoodFC.com.au

1931 births
2022 deaths
Australian rules footballers from Victoria (Australia)
Collingwood Football Club players